Amphipogon, the greybeard grasses, is a genus of Australian plants in the grass family.

 Species

 formerly included
see Diplopogon Melanocenchris  
 Amphipogon humilis - Melanocenchris jacquemontii
 Amphipogon setaceus - Melanocenchris setaceus

See also 
 List of Poaceae genera

References

External links 
 Grassbase - The World Online Grass Flora

Arundinoideae
Poaceae genera
Endemic flora of Australia